Lithuania competed at the World Games 2017 in Wroclaw, Poland, from 20 July 2017 to 30 July 2017. It is one of the smallest Lithuanian teams ever, participating only in one sport.

Competitors

Dance sport

Lithuania has qualified at the 2017 World Games:

Latin dance - Mixed pairs: Miglė Klupšaitė and Jokūbas Venckus
Standard dance - Mixed pairs: Ieva Žukauskaitė and Evaldas Sodeika and they won the bronze medal

References 

Nations at the 2017 World Games
2017 in Lithuanian sport
2017